Tie has two principal meanings:
 Tie (draw), a finish to a competition with identical results, particularly sports
 Necktie, a long piece of cloth worn around the neck or shoulders

Tie or TIE may also refer to:

Engineering and technology
 Tie (engineering), a strong component designed to keep two objects closely linked together
 Railroad tie, a rectangular support for the rail
 Tensilica Instruction Extension, a verilog-like language that is used to describe the instruction extensions to the Xtensa processor core
 Time Independent Escape Sequence, a modem protocol

Enterprises and organizations
 TiE (The Indus Entrepreneurs), a Silicon Valley non-profit
 Titanium Metals Corporation, with the stock symbol TIE on the New York Stock Exchange
 Transport Initiatives Edinburgh Ltd., an Edinburgh-based public transport company

Science
 Interpersonal ties, in sociology and psychology
 TIE receptors, specific types of cell surface receptors

Acronym

 Theatre in Education
 Time for Inclusive Education, an LGBT campaign group in Scotland
 Times Interest Earned, a financial ratio

People
 Tiê (born 1980), Brazilian singer-songwriter 
 Tahir Tie Domi (born 1969), Canadian retired National Hockey League player
 Lie Tie (director) (1913–1996), Chinese film director
 Li Tie (born 1977), Chinese retired footballer and Chinese national head coach
 Lin Tie (1904–1989), Chinese communist revolutionary leader and politician, first Communist Party Chief and second governor of Hebei province
 Esko Tie (1928–2002), Finnish ice hockey player
 Wang Tie (born 1957), Chinese former politician
 Cathy Tie (born 1996?), Chinese-Canadian bioinformatician and entrepreneur
 Tie Xuan (1366–1402), Chinese general
 Tie Ying (1916–2009), Chinese politician and major general
 Tie Yinghua (born 1993), Chinese kickboxer

Other uses
 Tie (music), a musical notation symbol joining two notes without a break
 Tie (typography), a punctuation and diacritical sign
 Tie (cavity wall), in construction
 Twist tie, a piece of wire embedded in paper or plastic
 TIE Fighter, a fictional spacecraft in the Star Wars universe

See also
 
 
 Beer tie, a requirement that a British public house buy at least some of its beer from a particular brewery or pub company
 Thai (disambiguation)
 Ti (disambiguation)
 Tye (disambiguation)
 Tying (disambiguation)